Adenosyl-chloride synthase (chlorinase, 5'-chloro-5'-deoxyadenosine synthase) is an enzyme with systematic name S-adenosyl-L-methionine:chloride adenosyltransferase. This enzyme catalyses the following chemical reaction

 S-adenosyl-L-methionine + chloride  5-deoxy-5-chloroadenosine + L-methionine

This enzyme is isolated from the marine bacterium Salinispora tropica.

References

External links 

EC 2.5.1